The nurturant parent model also "Nurturing Parent" is a metaphor, for a belief system, which is built upon an underlying value system. In this Nurturant Parenting contrasts with Stern Father parenting (Strict Father) as two distinct metaphors each used as icons of contrasting value and political systems, i.e. conservative (Strict Father) and liberal (Nurturing Parent).  

The Nurturant Parent metaphor draws on parenting style.  The ideal, effective Nurturing Parent gives his children both "roots in the ground and wings to fly." He or she does this by imparting, conveying, role-modeling and enforcing boundaries which encourage the child towards personal freedom (try out your new wings).  The Nurturant Parent model has a healthy respect for children's inherent intelligence.  As safe and appropriate, they can and should be allowed to explore their environment. Parents are responsible for protecting their child from serious mistakes, by offering guidance. A child will be picked up if the child cries because the parent wants the child to feel safe and supported. If a child grows up believing its needs are likely to be met, it will be more confident when facing challenges.

At the same time or alternately as appropriate, the Nurturant Parent encourages the child to have deep and peaceful roots in the ground through managed exercise of the child's own self-discipline, self-connection, age-appropriate house chores, limited allowance, discussion of both Feelings and Thoughts and mutually healthy boundaries with strangers, friends and adults generally. 

The above was originally expressed more simply as 'a family model where children are expected to explore their surroundings; at the same time, being protected by their parents.'

Other ideas:

 True discipline is much more than strict, unquestioning obedience.  Mutual respect and compassion are also rights.
 The outside world is no more inherently hostile than it is inherently friendly; stay alert, the world  commands respect
 Mutual respect and compassion are best taught by example.

Research 

This model is based on a study conducted by the Boston College Graduate Program in Human Development where researchers were investigating the parenting style preferred by parents of extraordinarily creative children. Most parenting books recommend the authoritative style. The researchers discovered another parenting style which they called "the nurturing parent" that focuses on responsibility, empathy, and creativity. The basic approach these parents used was to:

 Trust in their children's fairness and good judgment
 Respect their children's autonomy, thoughts and feelings
 Support their children's interests and goals
 Enjoy their children's company
 Protect their children from doing injury to self or others, not by establishing rules but by communicating values and discussing their children's behavior with them
 Modeling the self-control, sensitivity and values they believe their children will need

Further mentions 

In his unfinished book, Caring Parents: a Guide to Successful Parenting, clinical social worker Herbert Jay Rosenfield encourages use of the acronym "RECEPEE", for "Reasonable Expectations, Clearly Expressed, Performed Everyday and by Example". "The factors that children need to develop good self-esteem...are primarily 'gifts' from us parents!" writes Rosenfield, who offers another acronym "UCARE":

 Uniqueness that is positive, achieved through praise, encouragement, and positive feedback
 Connectiveness to family, to extended family, and to a neighborhood that is safe, healthy and moderate
 Age-appropriate autonomy: responsibilities and privileges that parallel their age and capabilities
 Role Examples: parent models with good self-esteem and behavior, whom they can emulate

Reverend George Englehardt stated succinctly, in 1991, that "parental responsibility is to provide their children with a safe, loving, nurturing environment".

The nurturant parent model is also discussed by George Lakoff in his books, including Moral Politics and Whose Freedom? In these books, the nurturant parent model is contrasted with the strict father model. Lakoff argues that if the metaphor of nation as family and government as parent is used, then progressive politics correspond to the nurturant parent model. For example, progressives want the government to make sure that the citizens are protected and assisted to achieve their potential. This might take the form of tough environmental regulations or healthcare assistance.

The model is also consistent with slow parenting in that children are encouraged to explore the world for themselves. They have to learn to face the risks that nature presents. Although slow parenting might go further and reduce the level of protection offered by parents, it would not advocate withholding it entirely.

See also
 Strict father model
 Slow parenting
 Parenting styles
 Dr Spock

References

Parenting
Political science